Difficulty or Difficult may refer to:
A problem
Degree of difficulty, in sport and gaming
Counter-majoritarian difficulty, in legal theory
Difficult, Tennessee, a community in the United States
"Difficult" (song), by Uffie
Hill Difficulty, a fictional place in the 1678 Christian allegory The Pilgrim's Progress